The Peloridiidae or moss bugs are a family of true bugs, comprising eighteen genera and thirty-four species. They are small, ranging in length from 2 to 4 mm, rarely seen, peculiarly lumpy, flattened bugs found in Patagonia (Argentina and Chile), New Zealand, eastern Australia, Lord Howe Island, and New Caledonia. Peloridiids are found amongst mosses and liverworts, commonly in association with southern beech forests. They have become known as moss bugs for their habit of feeding on mosses. Almost all Peloridiidae species are flightless, except one (Peloridium hammoniorum). Their present distribution suggests they have existed since before the breakup of Gondwana. They are the only living members of the suborder Coleorrhyncha, which first appeared in the Upper Permian, over 250 million years ago.

Evolution
Peloridiidae are the only extant family in the suborder Coleorrhyncha. Historically the Peloridiidae and their fossil kin were assigned to a variety of orders. In 1929 they were placed in the Homoptera, in 1962 they were placed in the Auchenorrhyncha, in 1963 they were placed in the Cicadomorpha, and in 1997 they were placed in Fulgoromorpha. However, essentially all sources since 1969 are in consensus that the Peloridiidae belong in Coleorrhyncha and that Coleorrhyncha is a sister group to the Heteroptera.

The question remains whether this affinity between the Coleorrhyncha and the Heteroptera necessitates the imposition of a suborder between them and the order Hemiptera. In 1995 Sorensen proposed the name Prosorrhyncha for such a suborder. (See the Heteroptera and Prosorrhyncha pages for a discussion).

The oldest members of Coleorrhyncha are known from the Upper Permian, over 250 million years ago, assigned to the family Progonocimicidae. It is likely that Progonocimicidae is paraphyletic, with other families of Coleorrhyncha derived from it. The closest relatives of Peloridiidae are the Hoploridiidae from the Early Cretaceous of Asia.

Genera

 Craspedophysa Burckhardt, 2009
 Hackeriella Evans, 1972
 Hemiodoecellus Evans, 1959
 Hemiodoecus China, 1924
 Hemiowoodwardia Evans, 1972
 Howeria Evans, 1959
 Idophysa Burckhardt, 2009
 Kuscheloides Evans, 1982
 Oiophysa Drake & Salmon, 1950
 Oiophysella Evans, 1982
 Pantinia China, 1962
 Peloridium Breddin, 1897
 Peloridora China, 1955
 Peltophysa Burckhardt, 2009
 Rhacophysa Burckhardt, 2009
 Xenophyes Bergroth, 1924
 Xenophysella Evans, 1982

Notes

References

Other reading
 
 
 
 
  Abstract

External links

 Images of Peloridium hammoniorum http://homepage.ruhr-uni-bochum.de/Andre.Mursch/14.htm

 
Coleorrhyncha
Hemiptera families
Extant Permian first appearances